The EXOPC is a Tablet PC, in slate form, that uses Windows 7 Home Premium as its operating system, and is designed by the company of the same name, based in Quebec, Canada. The EXOPC Slate is manufactured by Pegatron. The first EXOPC slate was launched in October 2010 directly from EXOPC Corp. on their website, and in Canada through the company Hypertechnologie Ciara.  Hypertechnologie Ciara markets the slate under the name Ciara Vibe. Probitas markets the EXOPC as Mobi-One in Southern Europe and North Africa. RM Education markets the EXOPC in the UK as the RM Slate. Leader Computers markets the EXOPC in  Australia. The EXOPC Slate is also currently available in the United States via the Microsoft Store, both online and in stores. Mustek markets it as the Mecer Lucid Slate in South Africa.

Hardware 
The architecture is based on an Intel Atom-M Pineview N450 CPU that is clocked at 1.66 GHz, and includes 2 GB of DDR2 SDRAM and 32 GB of solid-state drive (SSD) storage in its basic version, with an alternative model having a larger 64 GB SSD.

The EXOPC is also equipped with an accelerometer, which lets the display change from a portrait mode to a landscape mode by turning the slate in either direction. Internally it has four mini-PCIe slots of which three provide space for full-length cards and one half length. Three of these slots are in use and the fourth is available, but intended for a WWAN card. The unit also provides a SIM card slot.

Display 
The EXOPC has an 11.6-inch diagonal, capacitive multi-touch screen. The screen has a resolution of 1366 × 768 pixels (WXGA), a 16:9 ratio, and has 135 pixels per inch.
The screen's firmware currently allows detection of two points of simultaneous touch, but is technically capable of up to 10 points of touch.

A light sensor built into the front of the tablet automatically adjusts the display brightness to ambient condition.

It is also possible to use a capacitive stylus for precision work, such as hand-drawn art and graphic works.

Connectivity 
The EXOPC offers connectivity equivalent to that of a standard laptop:
 Wi-Fi IEEE 802.11b/IEEE 802.11g / IEEE 802.11n
 Bluetooth 2.1 + EDR
 Two USB 2.0 ports
 Audio in/out SuperJack
 Mini-HDMI for connecting to an external monitor or television, with a maximum output resolution of 1080p (upscaled from 1366 × 768)
 Dock connector

External power supply 
Recharging the battery is done through a standard external power supply:
 Size: 
 Weight: 
 Input: 100–240 V
 Output: 19 V, 2.1 amperes

Software features

Operating system 
The EXOPC uses Microsoft Windows 7 as its operating system. The company has developed a GUI interface around the standard Windows 7 GUI, nicknamed by the EXOPC community as the Connect Four Interface due to its full screen of interactive circles arranged in a grid pattern. A dedicated button on the touch-screen interface will minimize the EXOPC layer and reveal the Windows 7 desktop, allowing the user to have the EXOPC Slate act as a standard Windows computer when needed.

Applications

Pre-installed applications 
The EXOPC comes with the following pre-installed applications:
 Microsoft Security Essentials
 Microsoft .NET framework 4.0
 Microsoft Silverlight runtime for IE
 Adobe Flash Player 10.2 and Acrobat Reader for reading PDF files
 EXOPC GUI Layer

Store-specific applications 
An application library, similar to the Apple App Store or the Android Market is available for the device, accessible through the EXOPC UI.

Feedback 
The tablet captured the attention of several blogs and websites in the summer of 2010, being heralded as a possible alternative to the iPad. However, early reviews criticized the weight and battery life of the final product, as well as many missing features, the interface itself, sluggishness of the Internet browser, and difficulties to use the on-screen keyboard.

See also 
 WeTab – German version with the MeeGo-OS, and similar hardware

References

External links
 Official company website
 Manufacturer website 
 Website of Hypertechnologie Ciara, Inc. 
 EXOPC Microsoft Store

Computer companies of Canada
Tablet computers